Angelo Joseph Rossi (January 22, 1878 – April 5, 1948) was a U.S. political figure who served as the 31st mayor of San Francisco.

Life and career
Rossi was born in Volcano, Amador County, California, and came to San Francisco in 1890 with his widowed mother and six siblings after the family home and general store burned to the ground in minutes. (His father, also named Angelo, left Italy in 1849 at the age of 16 aboard a ship loaded with marble that departed from Genoa. When he arrived in Amador County, he mined for gold and opened his general store.) When Angelo arrived in San  Francisco with his family in 1890, he attended school but left after 6th grade to work in jobs that ranged from cash boy to a clerk in a couple of different florist shops, including Carbone and Sons and Pelicano and Sons, which became Pelicano and Rossi when he became a partner in the early 1900s. Eventually he opened  his own company, Angelo J. Rossi, Inc., and during his tenure in office the florist company continued to operate in a sparkling Art Deco-motif building Angelo owned at 45 Grant Avenue.

He was first appointed mayor when mayor James Rolph resigned to become Governor of California in January, 1931. After completing the remaining year of Rolph's term, Rossi was elected in his own right as mayor in November 1931. He was reelected mayor for second and third full terms in 1935 and 1939 respectively. Running for a fourth term as mayor in 1943, he was defeated when a protégé of his, George Reilly, ran against him, splitting the Catholic vote, and when Roger Lapham was tapped by business interests to run, in part to advance their cause regarding the City's purchase of the Market Street Railway.

A Republican, he served as San Francisco's mayor from 1931 to 1944. Rossi was mayor when the Golden Gate Bridge and the San Francisco–Oakland Bay Bridge were built, and he presided over the building of Treasure Island and the Golden Gate International Exposition (World's Fair) of 1939. Under his administration, the city resisted compliance with the Raker Act which required San Francisco to sell power from the Hetch Hetchy Reservoir in Yosemite to municipalities or municipal water districts, and not to any corporations, a condition of use of the Hetch Hetchy Valley. He dedicated the Mount Davidson Cross in March, 1934. He was a strong proponent of the New Deal alphabet-soup roster of work programs and worked vigorously and constantly with Washington to bring as many dollars to the City as possible in order to create jobs and improve the City's infrastructure.

Rossi was adamantly anti-Communist, and labeled the more militant labor organizing and strikes as the work of agitators. During the July San Francisco general strike of 1934, Rossi organized a committee to thwart the strike and move freight; he called on Governor Merriam to send the National Guard to quell the strike, but argued successfully against the governor who wanted to declare martial law. Two strikers were killed by bullets, and eighty-five were hospitalized.

On July 19, 1934, Mayor Rossi spoke on national radio, "I congratulate the real leaders of organized labor on their decision and the part they have played in ending the general strike. San Francisco has stamped out without bargain or compromise an attempt to import into its life the very real danger of revolt... We will deal effectively with the small group who opposed peace and plotted revolution."

When his police force raided political offices and worker organizations after the strike, Rossi issued a statement: "I pledge to you that as Chief Executive in San Francisco I will, to the full extent of my authority, run out of San Francisco every Communist agitator, and this is going to be a continuing policy in San Francisco."

During a period of publicized police scandal, he asked for and appropriated seventy thousand dollars to investigate corruption in the department. The District Attorney, Matthew Brady, hired Edwin Atherton, a private investigator, who published the Atherton Report on police corruption in 1937. He presided over groundbreaking ceremonies for the San Francisco City College in April 1937. He befriended and hosted Fiorello La Guardia in San Francisco and visited New York City as La Guardia's guest.

In an extended strike late in the late 1930s, Rossi lashed out at Harry Bridges, West Coast C.I.O. leader, saying the city is "sick of the alien" in a telegram to President Roosevelt, asking for federal intervention.  In May 1942, six months after the bombing of Pearl Harbor, at the Tenney Committee hearings held in San Francisco, Rossi was subpoenaed, having been accused of supporting Italian fascism. According to the New York Times of May 26, 1942,  "With tears in his eyes and a voice that broke with emotion, Mayor Angelo J. Rossi protested today his '100 per cent' loyalty to America and told a committee of the California Assembly that his presence before it as a witness was 'based on the damnable lies of irresponsible people'." He had been accused of making fascist salutes at San Francisco Columbus Day celebrations, which he strongly denied. Rossi testified that he removed a picture of Benito Mussolini from his office before the war began. He was defeated for reelection the following year following a rancorous campaign.

He died in 1948 and is buried in Holy Cross Cemetery, Colma, California. A city park-playground-pool and a street in the Richmond district of San Francisco are named after him.

See also 

 Margaret Mary Morgan
 Edwin Atherton
 Pete McDonough
 William J. Quinn

References 

 Bibliography 

 Ward, Estolvo, "The Gentle Dynamiter - 1983 Ramparts Press  LC#  382-80645   
 Treasure Island World's Fair - 1939 at www.sfmuseum.net
 San Francisco General Strike – Request for More Troops – 1934 at www.sfmuseum.org
 Labor Day Speech Monday, September 4, 1939

1878 births
1948 deaths
American Roman Catholics
Burials at Holy Cross Cemetery (Colma, California)
American people of Italian descent
Mayors of San Francisco
History of San Francisco
California Republicans
American anti-communists